The People of Monotheism may translate several Arabic terms:
 , a name the Druze use for themselves.
  is an Arabic term meaning "the monotheists". It has currency as:
 the Arabic name of the Almohads.
 the term used by the early followers of the 18th-century Arabian Muwahhidun movement of the reformer Muhammad ibn Abd al-Wahhab to describe themselves
 a term that adherents of Salafism use to describe themselves.
 a term that the Druze use to describe themselves.
 a term that the Alawites use to describe themselves.
 , "The People of Justice and Monotheism", a term used by the Mu'tazilis to describe themselves.

See also
 Monotheism
 Unitarianism

References

Monotheism